François Jacques Houssemayne du Boulay (London, 24 June 1759 – 28 October 1828) was a British financier and a prominent Huguenot.

Life and career 

Du Boulay was the son of Rev Benjamin François Houssemaine du Boulay and Louise Houssemaine du Boulay (née Lamotte) and the great grandfather of Sir James Houssemayne Du Boulay. He married Elizabeth Paris (31 August 1775 – 19 July 1814).  They had eight children.

Du Boulay was a stock jobber. At one time he was the largest holder of government stock on the Bank of England list.  On his death in 1828 his fortune included almost one-third of a million sterling in 3% three per cent Consolidated Bank Annuities (equivalent to £ in )..  He lived at “Forest Estate” at Walthamstow which was sold on his death and is now Forest School, Walthamstow.

References 

 Burke's Peerage Ltd Burke's Landed Gentry; 18th ed. Vol. 1–3.
 "Protestant exiles from France in the Reign of Louis XIV; or the Huguenot refugees and their descendants in Great Britain & Ireland"  David C Agnew 1821-1887
 "Bank of England archives" 1827 3% Consol holders list
 "The Huguenots" S Smiles 1881
 "A pedigree of the family of Houssemayne Du Boulay" James T Houssemayne Du Boulay 1908
  https://en.wikisource.org/wiki/Page:Protestant_Exiles_from_France_Agnew_vol_2.djvu/397

1759 births
1828 deaths
British bankers
Francois